Mitrofanov is a masculine surname. The feminine form is Mitrofanova. Notable persons with that name include:

 Aleksey Mitrofanov (born 1962), Russian politician
 Leopold Mitrofanov (1932–1992), Russian chess composer
 Mikhail Mitrofanov, Russian rugby league player
 Miroslav Mitrofanov (born 1966), Latvian politician
 Misha Mitrofanov (born 1997), American skater
 Oleksandr Mitrofanov (born 1977), Ukrainian footballer
 Pavel Mitrofanov (1857–1920), Russian embryologist and histologist
 Sergei Petrovich Mitrofanov (1915–2003), Russian industrial engineer
Vasily Mitrofanov (1899–1970), Soviet general
 Eleonora Mitrofanova (born 1953), Russian politician and diplomat
 Elina Mitrofanova (born 1992), Russian ice hockey player

See also 
 Mitrofan (disambiguation)

Russian-language surnames